Earl Rowe Provincial Park is an Ontario Parks recreational park located in Adjala–Tosorontio near Alliston, Ontario.

The idea for the park was spearheaded by Rowe when he was area MP and began with the first land purchase in 1957 and additional farm land before it opened in 1964, the now  park was named for former Lieutenant Governor  of Ontario William Earl Rowe.
The park features a large man made lake, Earl Rowe Lake, created by damming the Boyne River. The lake provides swimming area for campers.

See also
 Mono Cliffs Provincial Park
 Wasaga Beach Provincial Park

References

Provincial parks of Ontario
Protected areas established in 1964
1964 establishments in Ontario
Campsites in Canada